Universitas Mercatorum, the University of the System of the Italian Chambers of Commerce, is an accredited private for-profit online university founded in 2006 in Rome, Italy.

History
The name "Universitas Mercatorum" recalls the origin, the nature and the distinctive feature of the Chamber of Commerce. The University comprises the faculty of Economics and Management with 15 Bachelor courses and 4 Master's degrees. It also offers postgraduate studies and courses.

It is accredited by the Ministerial Decree 10 May 2006, Italian Official Journal no. 134 on June 12, 2006.

Rectors
Prof. Giorgio Marbach (2009-2014)
Prof. Giovanni Cannata (2015–present)

See also 
 List of Italian universities
 Rome
 Distance education

References

External links 

Universities and colleges in Rome
Educational institutions established in 2006
Rome
Distance education institutions based in Italy
Private universities and colleges in Italy